The Croatian Peasant Party (HSS) is an agrarian political party in Croatia founded on 22 December 1904 by Antun and Stjepan Radić as Croatian Peoples' Peasant Party (HPSS). The Brothers Radić believed that the realization of Croatian statehood was possible within Austria-Hungary, but that it had to be reformed as a Monarchy divided into three equal parts – Austria, Hungary, Croatia. After the creation of Kingdom of Yugoslavia in 1918, Party requested for the Croatian part of the Kingdom to be based on self-determination. This brought them great public support which culminated in 1920 parliamentary election when HPSS won all 58 seats assigned to Croatia.

In 1920, disgruntled with a bad position of Croats in the Kingdom, the party changed its name into Croatian Republican Peasant Party (HRSS) and started advocating secession from the Kingdom and the establishment of "peaceful peasant Republic of Croatia". On 1923 and 1925 election, HRSS doubled the number of won votes, and has thus become the second largest party in the Parliament.

In 1927, faced with a constant prosecution by the regime, HRSS was forced to soften its policy, change its name into Croatian Peasant Party (HSS), recognize the Vidovdan Constitution and form a coalition with Serbian People's Radical Party. This resulted in HSS losing its popularity which was seen in 1927 election when it lost almost third of votes won in the previous elections. After termination of the coalition agreement with the Radicals, HSS formed Peasant-Democratic Coalition with Pribičević's Independent Democratic Party. In 1928, Vladko Maček become the new president of HSS after the assassination of Stjepan Radić.

After King Alexander declared dictatorship in 1929, HSS was banned and its members prosecuted. HSS participated in the 1935 and 1938 election as a part of the United opposition coalition which helped it to regain its influence. In 1939, Cvetković–Maček Agreement helped in the establishing of the HSS-governed Banovina of Croatia. After the establishment of Nazi-puppet state, the so-called Independent State of Croatia (NDH) in 1941, HSS was banned once again, with half of its members joining either Ustaše or Partisans, and part staying loyal to Maček who believed that the victory of Allies would bring liberal democracy into Croatia and that HSS would return to power. In May 1945, Maček left the country, while HSS split into two fractions which boycotted the 1945 election because of their opposition to the Communists. During the period of SFR Yugoslavia (1945–1991), HSS was active abroad.

On 25 May 1991 HSS was restored under the leadership of Drago Stipac at the so-called Assembly of Unification. The party first entered Government after 2000 elections, on which it participated as part of liberal coalition (HSS-IDS-HNS-LS-SDA), with Ivica Račan (SDP) serving as Prime Minister and its president Zlatko Tomčić as Parliament Speaker. After HSS lost 2003 election, it moved to the opposition. In 2007 election, HSS formed yet another liberal coalition (HSLS-PGS-ZDS-ZS) and eventually ended up leading Ministries of Tourism and Agriculture in the Cabinet of Ivo Sanader II, and Ministries of Tourism and Regional Development in the Cabinet of Jadranka Kosor. In 2011 election party won only 1 seat in the Parliament as has moved to the opposition. In 2015 election HSS won 1 seats as part of the conservative Patriotic Coalition, and supported Tihomir Orešković as Prime Minister. In 2016 election, HSS won 5 seats as part of the liberal People's Coalition.

History

Radić presidency

The Croatian People's Peasant Party (Hrvatska pučka seljačka stranka, HPSS) was established in 1904 by brothers Stjepan Radić and Antun Radić in the Kingdom of Croatia-Slavonia – itself a part of the Hungarian part of the dualist Austria-Hungary at the time. The party pursued the establishment of a comprehensive grassroots network, national unity and agrarianism, as the Radić’s distrusted traditional political parties. Even though the HPSS achieved only minor significance before the end of World War I, the party gradually became a mass movement after 1918. This gave it the central role in the completion of Croatian national integration. The HPSS platform of antimilitarism and pacifism became very popular in the final year of the war, especially in Croatia-Slavonia, which was affected by widespread unrest associated with the Green Cadres. Furthermore, the restricted voting rights were expanded after 1918 by the introduction of universal manhood suffrage, allowing the proportionally large peasant population (80% of Croatia-Slavonia at the time) to predominantly vote for the HPSS. Antun Radić died in 1919, leaving Stjepan as the sole leader of the HPSS.

After the war, following the 1920 Croatian Peasant Rebellion, the HPSS became the only significant political party in Croatia, and the second largest party in the newly established Kingdom of Serbs, Croats and Slovenes (later renamed Yugoslavia). In 1920s, the HPSS policy was based on republicanism, opposition to further unification of the new state, demands for a neutral Croat peasant republic, and the advocation of national self-determination. To reinforce the republican message, the HPSS was formally renamed the Croatian Republican Peasant Party in 1920. Shortly following its accession to the Peasant International, the regime initiated a campaign to suppress the party activities in the run up to the 1925 Yugoslav parliamentary election using political, police, military and paramilitary pressure, and arresting its leaders. Even though the party achieved the second-largest share of seats, the government retained its parliamentary majority. Nonetheless, shortly after the election, there were negotiations between Radić and King Alexander's envoys. The talks ended in Radić renouncing republicanism and accepting the monarchy in return for his release and participation in a coalition government led by the People's Radical Party (NRS). The party was renamed the Croatian Peasant Party (HSS). Radić later admitted that he accepted the monarchy to protect his people.

The HSS had little real influence in the coalition government which lasted until 1927. At the same time, the Radić's participation in the coalition was criticised in Croatia and in the HSS – although not sufficiently to threaten his leadership. A part of the membership split in protest, forming the Croatian Federalist Peasant Party. The Communist Party of Yugoslavia (Komunistička partija Jugoslavije, KPJ) also criticised Radić for his cooperation with the regime. The KPJ had recently adopted the federalist approach to reform of the country and saw the republican movement of the HRSS as a potential recruitment pool. The HSS conversely, regardless of KPJ's formal federalist policy, saw the KPJ as unitarists and essentially a political endeavour to promote Serbian agenda.

The HSS left the government in January 1927. Radić resumed pursuit of resolution of the Croatian question by advocating unification of Croatian lands including Slavonia and Dalmatia into a single self-governing unit and stopping Italian immigration by abolishing the 1925 Treaty of Nettuno. In November, the HSS formed the Peasant-Democratic Coalition with the Independent Democratic Party (Samostalna demokratska stranka, SDS), the most popular party among the Serbs of Croatia. Tense relations between the opposition and the government deteriorated further until a shouting match in the parliament escalated to the point where NRS deputy Puniša Račić shot several HSS parliament members killing two and wounding three including Radić on 20 June 1928. Radić suggested that the shootings were a result of a regime plan and that the HSS should abandon pacifism. Soon afterwards, Radić died of the wounds on 8 August. Following the assassinations, the Yugoslav state lost any legitimacy among Croats – who appeared united in demands for overhaul of the state. HSS thus became the only major political party among Croats. Vladko Maček was elected to replace Radić almost immediately after his death.

Maček presidency

Under Maček, the HSS continued political opposition to the regime. The  which included the HSS, stood in 1935 and 1938 Yugoslavian parliamentary election. In the latter, the United Opposition won the majority of votes, but due to operation of the election law, it received 67 out of 373 seats in the parliament.

The force was established to protect Croats against paramilitaries supported or tolerated by the regime. The force was also designed as a response to Ustaše challenge for dominance among Croats as a force capable of providing physical protection following the Velebit uprising. It was meant to demonstrate that the HSS is not a pacifist organisation resigned to passivity. In cities, the HSZ operated under the name of Croatian Civil Defence.

In 1936 and 1937, Maček unsuccessfully negotiated with Regent Prince Paul Prime Minister Milan Stojadinović with the aim of consolidation of Croatian lands within Yugoslavia – with a degree of autonomy. Then, after contacting several European governments and failing to get their support, he turned to Italian foreign minister Galeazzo Ciano in 1938. Through an intermediary, Maček explained the HSS wanted Croatia united as a federal unit of Yugoslavia encompassing territories of former Croatia–Slavonia to a line between Ilok and Sremska Mitrovica, and Dalmatia without the Bay of Kotor with the addition of Bosnia and Herzegovina west of Vrbas and Neretva Rivers. At the time, Italy was harbouring and supporting Croatian nationalist group Ustaše, but Ciano preferred to work with Maček because the HSS enjoyed far greater support among Croats and because Ciano believed that would discourage contacts between the HSS and Nazi Germany – denying German access to the Adriatic Sea. Ciano wrote back to Maček urging him to demand more territory and elaborate on his ideas.

In 1939, Stojadinović was replaced by Dragiša Cvetković and Maček contacted him with the same request. The two reached a preliminary agreement, but Prince Paul vetoed the idea objecting to partition of Bosnia and Herzegovina. Maček then wrote back to Ciano explaining that he seeks status of a federal unit for Croatia within Yugoslavia, with joint foreign affairs, defence, central bank, state monopolies, and customs. He modified the territorial demands by moving the Vrbas line to the Bosna River. In return, the Italian Foreign Ministry drafted a document offering Maček a loan to finance an uprising which the HSS would launch and then invite Italian military intervention. The plan also envisaged establishment of a Croatian state under Italian protection. Maček wrote back declining the offer and saying that was not what he asked for and that he had struck a deal with Cvetković government in the meantime.

The Cvetković–Maček Agreement was concluded on 26 August 1939 establishing autonomous Banovina of Croatia. Maček became the deputy prime minister of Yugoslavia and several members of the Peasant–Democratic Coalition were added to the cabinet. The agreement angered Ustaše who launched a propaganda campaign against Maček and the HSS as traitors of Croatian interests while Italy switched its support back to Ustaše.

World War II and afterwards 

The party's fortunes declined precipitously with the outbreak of World War II and the Axis invasion in April 1941. Some party members were divided among those who sympathized with the Croatian fascist Ustasha independence movement, and those whose left-leaning beliefs led them to join the Partisans. But the vast majority of HSS supporters remained passive and neutral for the duration of the war as the Ustasha, the communist Partisans and the royalist Chetniks fought for control.

After the communist victory, the KPJ established one-party rule — the HSS, along with other political parties were declared illegal. In 1947, HSS joined the International Peasants' Union. Maček represented the HSS in exile until his death in 1964. Juraj Krnjević took over as leader until his own death 1988, only a year before the HSS could resume its work within Croatia.

Modern party 

With the advent of multi-party system in 1990, the HSS was reconstituted and on the 1990 election won several seats in the Croatian Parliament. They remained in opposition until the 2000 elections when they received three ministerial portfolios as part of their participation in the winning Social Democratic Party of Croatia-led coalition.

On elections 2000 HSS led center coalition alongside IDS-HNS-LS and Coalition won 25 seats in parliament with 17 seats for HSS (16 domestic and one minority seat).
After the elections HSS formed coalition with SDP and had three ministers in government (education, agriculture and entrepreneurship), vice president of government and Speaker of Croatian Parliament, Zlatko Tomčić.

On local elections 2001. HSS achieved its best results ever and won 8 out of 21 county prefects (župan) and lot of municipalities and towns and became party which was second in number of local elected officials.

Today, the HSS considers itself among other center European political parties that advocate pro-agrarian policies and greater economic interventionism by the state. On social matters the HSS is largely conservative, supporting a Christian-based morality in public life. HSS is an associate member of the European People's Party (EPP).

At the elections in November 2003, the party won 7.2% of the popular vote and 10 out of 151 seats (nine domestic seats and one minority seat).

Before the 2007 parliamentary elections, HSS announced a coalition with opposition parties Alliance of Primorje-Gorski Kotar and Croatian Social Liberal Party. The coalition received 6.5% of the popular vote and 8 out of 153 seats (six for HSS itself). After elections they became part of Ivo Sanader's governing coalition and received two ministerial portfolios (regional development and tourism), vicepresident of government and vicepresident of Parliament.

On 2011 parliamentary elections party score worst result in party's history receiving only one parliamentary seat and 3% of popular vote.

Party convention 28 January 2012 elected Branko Hrg as new president.

In 2014 Croatian Peasant Party in coalition with Croatian Democratic Union won one seat in European Parliament – Marijana Petir. However, on 6 June 2017 Petir was expelled from Croatian Peasant Party, which left the party without seats in European Parliament.

Election history

Parliamentary 
The following is a summary of HSS's results in parliamentary elections for the Croatian parliament. The "Total votes" and "Percentage" columns include sums of votes won by pre-election coalitions HSS had been part of. After preferential votes were introduced into the electoral system, the total votes column includes the statistic of the sum of votes given to HSS candidates on the coalition lists. The "Total seats" column includes sums of seats won by HSS in election constituencies plus representatives of ethnic minorities affiliated with HSS.

Presidential 
The following is a list of presidential candidates who were endorsed by HSS.

European Parliament

Party presidents 
 Stjepan Radić (1904–1928)
 Vladko Maček (1928–1964)
 Juraj Krnjević (1964–1988)
 Josip Torbar (1988–1991)
 Drago Stipac (1991–1994)
 Zlatko Tomčić (1994–2005)
 Josip Friščić (2005–2012)
 Branko Hrg (2012–2016)
 Krešo Beljak (2016–)

See also 
 Croatian Peasant Party (Bosnia and Herzegovina)
 Slovene Peasant Party

References

Sources

Further reading

External links
 

1904 establishments in Croatia
Agrarian parties
Anti-communist parties
Centrist parties in Croatia
Liberal parties in Croatia
Member parties of the European People's Party
Organizations based in Zagreb
Political parties established in 1904
Political parties in Austria-Hungary
Political parties in Yugoslavia
Pro-European political parties in Croatia
Social liberal parties